Logology (or ludolinguistics) is the field of recreational linguistics, an activity that encompasses a wide variety of  word games and wordplay. The term is analogous to the term "recreational mathematics".

Overview
Some of the topics studied in logology are lipograms, acrostics, palindromes, tautonyms, isograms, pangrams, bigrams, trigrams, tetragrams, transdeletion pyramids, and pangrammatic windows.

The term logology was adopted by Dmitri Borgmann to refer to recreational linguistics.

Notable logologists
Dmitri Borgmann
A. Ross Eckler, Jr.
Willard R. Espy
Jeremiah Farrell
Martin Gardner
Mike Keith
Douglas Hofstadter

See also

Constrained writing
List of forms of word play
Oulipo
Word Ways: The Journal of Recreational Linguistics

References

Bibliography

Books

Periodicals
Word Ways: The Journal of Recreational Linguistics.  Greenwood Periodicals et al., 1968–.  ISSN 0043-7980.
The Palindromist.  Mark Saltveit, 1996–.
The Enigma. National Puzzlers' League, 1883–.

Word games
Applied linguistics